November 4 - Eastern Orthodox liturgical calendar - November 6

All fixed commemorations below celebrated on November 18 by Eastern Orthodox Churches on the Old Calendar.

For November 5th, Orthodox Churches on the Old Calendar commemorate the Saints listed on October 23.

Saints
 Apostles Patrobus, Hermas, Linus, Gaius, and Philologus, of the Seventy (1st century)  (see also: November 4)
 Martyrs Galacteon and his wife Episteme at Emesa (253)
 Martyrs Domninus, Timothy, Theophilus, Theotimus, Dorotheus, Eupsychius, Carterius, Silvanus, Pamphilius, Philotheos, Nearchos and other martyrs of Palestine (307)  (see also: November 15)
 Martyr Castor the Bishop, by fire, and Martyr Agathangelus, by the sword.
 Saint Domentius and Paul the Bishop.
 Venerable Gregory, Patriarch of Alexandria, Confessor (9th century)

Pre-Schism Western saints
 Saint Felix and Eusebius, martyrs in Terracina, between Rome and Naples in Italy (1st century)
 Saint Domninus, first Bishop of Grenoble in France (4th century)
 Saint Dominator, fourteenth Bishop of Brescia in Lombardy in Italy (c. 495)
 Saint Fibitius, Abbot of a monastery in Trier in Germany, and the twenty-first bishop of that city (c. 500)
 Saint Magnus, Archbishop of Milan in Italy from 520 to 525, Confessor (525)
 Saint Laetus, a monk at the age of twelve, he is honoured near Orleans in France, his relics enshrined in the village of Saint-Lyé-la-Forêt (533)
 Saint Cybi (Kybi, Kebius, Cuby), Abbot, of Cornwall and Wales (550)  (see also: November 8)
 Saint Hermenegild, a monk at Salcedo in Galicia in Spain (586)
 Saint Augustine and Paulinus, monks sent by St Benedict to found the monastery of Terracina in Italy (6th century)
 Saint Kea (Kay, Kenan), Bishop of Devon and Cornwall (6th century)
 Saint Bertilla (Berthild of Chelles), a nun at Jouarre near Meaux in France, who became Abbess of Chelles Abbey (c. 705)
 Saint Spinulus (Spinula, Spin), a monk at Moyenmoutier with St Hidulf, later founder of the monastery of Bégon-Celle (now Saint-Blasien) (707 or 720)
 Saint Kanten (Cannen), founder of Lianganten in Powys in Wales (8th century)
 Saint Odrada, Virgin, of Balen, Netherlands (8th century)
 Saint Gregory, a monk at Cassano, Calabria (1002)  (see also: November 4)

Post-Schism Orthodox saints
 Saint Jonah, Archbishop of Novgorod (1470)
 Saint Hilarion, Recluse, of Troekurovo (1853)
 Saint Dositheus, monk of Glinsk Hermitage (1874)

New martyrs and confessors
 New Hieromartyr Gabriel Maslennikov, Priest of Ryazan (1937)

Other commemorations
 Consecration of the Church of Theodore Tyron, in the "Sforakio" district of Constantinople.
 Election to the patriarchal throne of St. Tikhon, Patriarch of Moscow and All Rus (1917)
 Repose of Abbess Anna of Vraćevšnica monastery, Serbia (1975) 
 Repose of Hieromonk Raphael (Ogorodnikov) of Porkhov, Pskov (1988)

Icon gallery

Notes

References

Sources
 November 5/November 18. Orthodox Calendar (PRAVOSLAVIE.RU).
 November 18 / November 5. HOLY TRINITY RUSSIAN ORTHODOX CHURCH (A parish of the Patriarchate of Moscow).
 November 5. OCA - The Lives of the Saints.
 The Autonomous Orthodox Metropolia of Western Europe and the Americas (ROCOR). St. Hilarion Calendar of Saints for the year of our Lord 2004. St. Hilarion Press (Austin, TX). p. 83.
 The Fifth Day of the Month of November. Orthodoxy in China.
 November 5. Latin Saints of the Orthodox Patriarchate of Rome.
 The Roman Martyrology. Transl. by the Archbishop of Baltimore. Last Edition, According to the Copy Printed at Rome in 1914. Revised Edition, with the Imprimatur of His Eminence Cardinal Gibbons. Baltimore: John Murphy Company, 1916. p. 342.
 Rev. Richard Stanton. A Menology of England and Wales, or, Brief Memorials of the Ancient British and English Saints Arranged According to the Calendar, Together with the Martyrs of the 16th and 17th Centuries. London: Burns & Oates, 1892. p. 526.

 Greek Sources
 Great Synaxaristes:  5 ΝΟΕΜΒΡΙΟΥ. ΜΕΓΑΣ ΣΥΝΑΞΑΡΙΣΤΗΣ.
  Συναξαριστής. 5 Νοεμβρίου. ECCLESIA.GR. (H ΕΚΚΛΗΣΙΑ ΤΗΣ ΕΛΛΑΔΟΣ).
  05/11/2015. Ορθόδοξος Συναξαριστής.

 Russian Sources
  18 ноября (5 ноября). Православная Энциклопедия под редакцией Патриарха Московского и всея Руси Кирилла (электронная версия). (Orthodox Encyclopedia - Pravenc.ru).
  5 ноября по старому стилю  /  18 ноября по новому стилю. Русская Православная Церковь - Православный церковный календарь на 2015 год.

November in the Eastern Orthodox calendar